Anand Shankar Singh is an Indian politician and is currently a Member of Bihar Legislative Assembly in the 2015 & 2020 Bihar Legislative Assembly election from Aurangabad (Bihar Vidhan Sabha constituency) in Bihar.

References

Living people
People from Aurangabad district, Bihar
Bihar MLAs 2020–2025
Year of birth missing (living people)